Varnous or Varnoundas (also called Peristeri) is a mountain in northern Florina regional unit, Greece, situated between the town of Florina and Lake Prespa, and just south of the border with North Macedonia. Its highest peak, named Gkarvani, is 2,334 m. It is part of the same massif that continues northwards into the Baba mountains with Mount Pelister (2,601 m) as its highest peak.

Other mountaintops includes Belavoda (Μπελαβόδα) at 2,179 m, Kirko (Κίρκο) at 2,155 m, Kotsyfa or Potistres (Κότσυφα or Ποτίστρες) at 2,065 m and more.

Trails

The E6 European long distance path passes over the Varnous mountain, leading through Agios Germanos and Vigla Pisoderiou.

Ecology
The mountain is largely forested with spruce, it has an upper alpine vegetation in the highest points of the mountain. It features large animals including bears, wolves, roebucks, wild boars and wild goats. The western part of the mountain is part of Prespa Park.

External links
  Greek Mountain Flora
Arktouros, Varnous

References

Two-thousanders of Greece
Landforms of Florina (regional unit)
Mountains of Western Macedonia

el:Βαρνούντας